Indian relish is a spicy relish used as a condiment or side dish. It consists of variety of vegetables and fruit that can include chopped bell peppers, sweet onion, garlic, tomatoes, sour apples, mustard, cloves, white wine vinegar, crushed red pepper flakes, ginger, and sugar. Recipes for Indian relish started appearing in cookbooks during the 1700s. Indian relish was imported from India and became popular in England and Scotland during the 18th century.

Piccalilli is a form of Indian relish popular in England.

Indian relish was served in dining establishments such as the City of Jacksonville steamship in the early 1920s and sold commercially in jars, including by Heinz and B&G Foods in the U.S. Like other chutneys, it can be made a wide array of variants with different ingredients.

See also
 South Asian pickle
 List of condiments

References

Indian cuisine
Pakistani cuisine